Trashigang, or Tashigang, meaning "fortress of auspicious mount," is a town in eastern Bhutan and the district capital of the Trashigang Dzongkhag (district).

The town lies to the east side of the valley above the Drangme Chhu river just south of where it is joined by the Gamri River. Trashigang is the eastern terminus of the Lateral Road, Bhutan's main highway leading to Phuntsholing in the southwest.

History
Trashigang Dzong was built in 1659 by Trongsa Penlop Minjur Tenpa and served for centuries as an administrative headquarters and monastery, though government offices mostly relocated by 2011. Its sinking eastern foundation and crumbling upper walls necessitated either relocation or total destruction and reconstruction. In October 2011, dzong, under renovation since 2007, was on the verge of collapse. However, the Trashigang Dzong was still used for the town's yearly religious festival called tsechu.

Administrative
Trashigang is the largest district in Bhutan and serves as the administrative seat for the Dzongkhag and a home for the monk body. It has three sub-districts and fifteen gewogs, which include Bartsham, Bidung, Kanglung, Kangpara, Khaling, Lumang, Merak, Phongmey, Radhi, Sakteng, Samkhar, Shongphu, Thrimshing, Udzorong, and Yangneer. Sherubtse College was the first accredited college in Bhutan, founded in 1966 by a group of Jesuits under the leadership of William Mackey. As of 2003, it became part of the newly created Royal University of Bhutan system that comprises all public post-secondary schools in Bhutan.

Rangjung, Kanglung and Wamrong are some of the major towns under Trashigang district.

Demography
The population of Trashigang town was 3,037 (1,565 males and 1,472 females) according to the 2017 Population and Housing Census of Bhutan.

Transport

Trashigang is served by Yonphula Airport which is around an hour drive from the town.

Climate
Trashigang features a dry-winter subtropical highland climate (Köppen Cwb).

Gallery

See also 
 Chorten Kora
 Duksum

References

External links

 
 Trashigang and Dzong, Bhutan - Photo Gallery | The India Info

Populated places in Bhutan